The black-naped tern (Sterna sumatrana) is an oceanic tern mostly found in tropical and subtropical areas of the Pacific and Indian Oceans. It is rarely found inland.

Description 
The tern is about 30 cm long with a wing length of 21–23 cm. Their beaks and legs are black, but the tips of their bills are yellow. They have long forked tails. The black-naped tern has a white face and breast with a grayish-white back and wings. The first couple of their primary feathers are gray.

There are two listed subspecies:

S. s. mathewsi (Stresemann, 1914) – islands of the western Indian Ocean
S. s. sumatrana (Raffles, 1822) – islands of the eastern Indian Ocean through to the western Pacific & Australasia

References

External links
 Kiru Dhooni

black-naped tern
Birds of the Maldives
Birds of Seychelles
Birds of Southeast Asia
Birds of Oceania
black-naped tern
Articles containing video clips